Artesia is a town in Lowndes County, Mississippi. The population was 440 at the 2010 census.

History
Artesia was originally Artesia Junction, a junction point on the Mobile and Ohio Railroad. During the railroad's construction in the 1850s, an offer was made to the towns of Columbus and Aberdeen to route the railroad through the towns, but both towns refused. Columbus reconsidered a few months later; but by that time, the railway had already chosen a route well to the west of the town. However, the railroad did extend a spur line in order to serve Columbus, and that spur line joins the main line at the site of present-day Artesia.

Artesia was the site of a voter suppression incident in 1876 in which a group of heavily armed white men from Starkville came to intimidate black voters in the Republican Club. Federal troops were called to intervene, which enraged many whites, who depicted the event as a negro riot.

The name originates from a cluster of artesian wells that were found in the area.

Geography
Artesia is located at  (33.416077, -88.645249).

Demographics
As of the 2010 United States Census, there were 440 people living in the town. 84.5% were African American, 13.0% White, 1.1% Asian, 0.2% from some other race and 1.1% of two or more races. 0.5% were Hispanic or Latino of any race.

As of the census of 2000, there were 498 people, 176 households, and 124 families living in the town. The population density was 671.8 people per square mile (259.8/km2). There were 196 housing units at an average density of 264.4 per square mile (102.3/km2). The racial makeup of the town was 79.32% African American, 19.88% White, 0.20% Asian, 0.40% Pacific Islander, and 0.20% from two or more races. Hispanic or Latino of any race were 0.80% of the population.

There were 176 households, out of which 39.8% had children under the age of 18 living with them, 34.7% were married couples living together, 30.7% had a female householder with no husband present, and 29.0% were non-families. 27.3% of all households were made up of individuals, and 12.5% had someone living alone who was 65 years of age or older. The average household size was 2.83 and the average family size was 3.50.

In the town, the population was spread out, with 33.7% under the age of 18, 10.4% from 18 to 24, 27.5% from 25 to 44, 18.1% from 45 to 64, and 10.2% who were 65 years of age or older. The median age was 28 years. For every 100 females, there were 86.5 males. For every 100 females age 18 and over, there were 83.3 males.

The median income for a household in the town was $18,438, and the median income for a family was $21,429. Males had a median income of $20,000 versus $13,750 for females. The per capita income for the town was $8,716. About 42.2% of families and 43.0% of the population were below the poverty line, including 60.0% of those under age 18 and 13.0% of those age 65 or over.

Education
The Town of Artesia is served by the Lowndes County School District.

References

Towns in Lowndes County, Mississippi
Towns in Mississippi